Samudram is a 1999 Indian Telugu-language action film, produced by J.Bhagavan, D. V. V. Danayya under the Sri Balaji Art Creations banner and directed by Krishna Vamsi. It stars Jagapati Babu, Sakshi Shivanand, Srihari, Prakash Raj and Ravi Teja, with music composed by Shashi Preetam. The film won three state Nandi Awards.

Plot 
The film begins with a murder convict, Sagar, being moved to the Vizag Central Jail. He attempts to escape but is grabbed, tormented, and kept in solitary confinement.  

The film flashes back to Sagar's past. He is an easy-going youngster who lives with his widowed mother, sister Chanti, girlfriend Rajyalakshmi, and friends. Meanwhile, Chepala Krishna is a thug pilot smuggler who aims to participate in politics. Chepala Nani, his younger brother, is a hoodlum who pains the locals. Sagar brawls with him, putting a target on his back.  

Meanwhile, C.I. Srihari, a stout-hearted cop newly deputed to the region, encounters Chepala Krishna's criminal acts and settlements with the aid of trustworthy S.I. Krishnam Raju. Shortly before Krishna is approached to be nominated to the MLA, Srihari apprehends him in a petty case and  ensures he is unable to contest any election in the coming 5 years. Krishna and Nani seek vengeance. 

Sagar arranges an engagement for Chanti. On the day of the engagement, Sagar collects the jewelry. Simultaneously, Srihari chases Nani with his team. Krishnam Raju turns out to be a traitor, who attacks and kills Srihari. Sagar, who is passing by on the path, sees the situation and rushes to protect Srihari, but it's too late. Sagar is framed, and the judiciary declares him guilty and sentences him to life. Nukaraju, a humble constable at the prison, reveals he is an avid admirer of the late Srihari. Nani attempts to molest Chanti, and amidst the chaos Sagar's mother is injured and hospitalized. 

Sagar is permitted to see his mother, and Nukaraju helps him escape permanently. Sagar sets out to destroy Chapala Krishna’s domain. Simultaneously, Nukkaraju is suspended for helping Sagar. During the trial, he detects something fishy about Srihari’s death and opens the formal. Sagar abducts Nani & Krishnam Raju. Nukkaraju tells the truth to the court and is able to acquire the real postmortem report with Sagar's help. Sagar defeats Nani and Chapala Krishna, is aquitted of the murder charge, and asks Nukkaraju to marry Chanti.

Cast

Soundtrack 

Music composed by Shashi Preetam.

Production 
Initially the film planned with  Nagarjuna Akkineni in the lead role as Anyayam. But in the location scouting, an audien came to Krishna Vamsi and compared his film Gulabi with RGV style. Basing on that comparison, Krishna Vamsi immediately cancelled the project and made Ninne Pelladatha instead.

Awards 
Nandi Awards
 Best Villain – Tanikella Bharani 
 Best Audiographer – Madhusudhana Reddy 
 Best Editor - Shankar

References

External links 
 

Films directed by Krishna Vamsi
1999 films
1990s Telugu-language films